Kirnapur is a town and block of Balaghat district in Madhya pradesh, India. It is a well-developed and a major town in balaghat district, and approx 30 km away from district headquarters. It is the birthplace of Krishnkant Soni.

Villages 
 Sarad-Seoni
 Rajegaon
 Kinhi-Kakodi
 Hirri
 Paraswada
 Koste
 Kotri
 Seonikhurd
 Laveri
 Kaneri
 Wara
 Newara
 Aamgaon
 Badgaon
 Binora
 Seoti
 Nakshi
 Mundesara
 Kandri

References

Cities and towns in Balaghat district